Talawanda is an administrative ward in Chalinze District of Pwani Region in Tanzania. 
According to the 2012 census, the ward has a total population of 9,229.

References

Pwani Region